The Whittington Estate, also known as Highgate New Town, is a housing estate in the London Borough of Camden, North London, England. It was designed in a modernist style by Peter Tabori for Camden Council's Architects Department. Construction work commenced in 1972 and was completed in 1979, five years later than planned. The estate was designed by Tabori initially as his final year project at the Regents Street Polytechnic under the name Highgate New Town; Sydney Cook, the head of Camden Architects Department went on to commission Tabori to make the estate a reality.

Description 
The estate comprises 6 parallel terraces with pedestrian streets running between; it is built primarily out of precast concrete with dark-stained timber used for the doors and windows. Camden Architects Department are famous for their application of low-rise high-density design for their housing estates under Sydney Cook in the 60s and 70s, the Whtitington Estate being a prime example of this design principle. Flats are arranged in a ziggurat arrangement with south-facing balconies or terraces for each flat, giving each flat access to plentiful natural light. There is a small park, a sports pitch and a children's playground on the estate grounds as well as numerous planters containing greenery lining the streets.

References 

Brutalist architecture in London
Housing estates in the London Borough of Camden
Ziggurat style modern architecture
Modernist architecture in England
Modernist architecture